Rudbar (also Romanized as Rūdbār; also known as Rūdbār-e Gowdeh and Rūdbār Kowdeh) is a village in Deh Tall Rural District, in the Central District of Bastak County, Hormozgan Province, Iran. At the 2006 census, its population was 803, in 163 families.

References 

Populated places in Bastak County